"Born to Raise Hell" is a song by the British rock band Motörhead. Originally written by Lemmy Kilmister for the German band Skew Siskin, it plays over the opening credits of the 1994 film Airheads in which Lemmy makes a cameo appearance.

The song was released as a single in November 1994, featuring Lemmy, Ice-T and Ugly Kid Joe lead singer Whitfield Crane. The single features a radio edit, the original Bastards album version and the Dust Brothers Live and Funky Mix. A special 12" vinyl picture disc pressing was made, using the same picture as the CD single release.

This version was recorded in addition to the previous recordings of "Hellraiser" and "Hell on Earth", as a last minute job to play over the end credits of the Hellraiser III: Hell on Earth film, although it didn't appear on the film's original soundtrack album.

At 2016's Bloodstock Open Air Festival, Phil Campbell & The Bastard Sons (formerly The Phil Campbell All Starr Band) covered the track with guest vocals from Twisted Sister's Dee Snider as a tribute to Lemmy.

A small excerpt was used in the 2019 film Fighting with My Family.

Single track listing
Song by Lemmy
 "Born to Raise Hell" (Radio Edit) – 4:02
 "Born to Raise Hell" (Album Version) – 4:56
 "Born to Raise Hell" (Dust Brothers Live and Funky Mix) – 3:52

Personnel 
 Motörhead
 Lemmy – lead vocals, bass
 Phil "Wizzö" Campbell – guitars
 Würzel – guitars
 Mikkey Dee – drums
 Guest musicians
 Ice-T and Whitfield Crane – vocals
 Michael Monroe – backing vocals

References

1993 songs
1994 singles
Motörhead songs
Ice-T songs
Song recordings produced by Howard Benson
Songs written by Lemmy